William George "Bill" Unruh (born August 28, 1945) is a Canadian physicist at the University of British Columbia, Vancouver who described the hypothetical Unruh effect in 1976.

Early life and education
Unruh was born into a Mennonite family in Winnipeg, Manitoba. His parents were Benjamin Unruh, a refugee from Russia, and Anna Janzen, who was born in Canada. He obtained his B.Sc. from the University of Manitoba in 1967, followed by an M.A. (1969) and Ph.D. (1971) from Princeton University, New Jersey, under the direction of John Archibald Wheeler.

Areas of research
Unruh has made seminal contributions to our understanding of gravity, black holes, cosmology, and quantum fields in curved spaces, including the discovery of what is now known as the Unruh effect. Unruh has contributed to the foundations of quantum mechanics in areas such as decoherence and the question of time in quantum mechanics. He has helped to clarify the meaning of nonlocality in a quantum context, in particular that quantum nonlocality does not follow from Bell's theorem and that ultimately quantum mechanics is a local theory. Unruh is also one of the main critics of the Afshar experiment.

Unruh is also interested in music and teaches the Physics of Music.

The Unruh effect

The Unruh effect, described by Unruh in 1976, is the prediction that an accelerating observer will observe black-body radiation where an inertial observer would observe none. In other words, the accelerating observer will find itself in a warm background, the temperature of which is proportional to the acceleration. The same quantum state of a field, which is taken to be the ground state for observers in inertial systems, is seen as a thermal state for the uniformly accelerated observer. The Unruh effect therefore means that the very notion of the quantum vacuum depends on the path of the observer through spacetime.

The Unruh effect can be expressed in a simple equation giving the equivalent energy kT of a uniformly accelerating particle (with a being the constant acceleration), as:

References

External links
 University of British Columbia Physics Dept. page
 Dr. Unruh's course webpage - PHYS 200 Introduction to Relativity and Quanta
 UBC Theoretical Physics Homepage - a web server ran by Unruh

1945 births
Living people
Canadian physicists
Canadian Mennonites
Fellows of the Royal Society
People from Winnipeg
Princeton University alumni
Relativity theorists
Academic staff of the University of British Columbia
University of Manitoba alumni